A music leak is an unauthorized release of music over the internet. Songs or albums may leak days or months before their scheduled release date. In other cases, the leaked material may be demos or scrapped work never intended for public release. Leaks often originate from hackers who gain unauthorized access to the online storage of an artist, label, producer, or journalist.

Sources
Unreleased music is often acquired by hackers who gain unauthorized access to the e-mail or cloud storage accounts of artists, producers or record labels.

Some leaks originate from advance copies sent to journalists, either being leaked by the journalists themselves, or by individuals who gain unauthorized access to these advance copies. For example, the 2006 Joanna Newsom album Ys was leaked when a hacker gained access to an FTP server maintained by the online music publication Pitchfork. In 2015, a server controlled by the music website Spin was hacked, resulting in the leaking of albums by Beach House, Mac DeMarco, and Destroyer.

It has been alleged that some record labels intentionally stage leaks to create publicity.

Distribution
During the 1990s, leaked music was occasionally shared on the internet, despite relatively slow transmission speeds and music codecs being in their infancy. One of the first albums to leak on the internet was Depeche Mode's 1993 album Songs of Faith and Devotion, which was shared by fans in chat rooms.

In the early 2000s, peer-to-peer file sharing sites such as Napster were widely used not only for musical piracy, but also for the distribution of leaked music. The landmark copyright lawsuit Metallica v. Napster, Inc. centered on the leak of a demo recording of the Metallica song "I Disappear", which was planned to be released as part of the soundtrack to Mission: Impossible II. The leaked demo, which made its way onto radio airplay, was traced to Napster.

As peer-to-peer file sharing services declined in popularity, other channels have been used for the distribution of leaked music, such as BitTorrent and "cyberlocker" services such as MediaFire.

Reactions
When a song or album leaks ahead of its scheduled release date, record labels often react by moving the release earlier, a process which became simpler as music has shifted from physical to mostly digital distribution. An early example of this was Eminem's 2002 album The Eminem Show. Originally scheduled for June, its release date was moved to May 28 after the album leaked that month.

The effect of an early leak on an album's ultimate sales or popularity is unclear. In 2000, the album Kid A, by the English rock band Radiohead, was leaked online and shared on the peer-to-peer service Napster. Asked whether he believed Napster had damaged sales, Capitol president Ray Lott likened the situation to unfounded concern about home taping in the 1980s. In some cases, a leak may precipitate an official release for materials not planned for release. For example, in 2019, Radiohead released MiniDiscs [Hacked], an archive of recordings made around the recording of their 1997 album OK Computer, after a hacker leaked them online.

Labels may attempt to stop or slow the spread of leaked files by issuing DMCA takedown notices to websites hosting leaked material, or search engines which index these sites.

Prevalence
Album leaks have become increasingly common, with some record executives stating that, beginning in the late 2000s, most albums leak "as a matter of course", though many of these leaks occur shortly before the album's scheduled release and therefore have relatively little effect. When Watch the Throne, a 2011 collaboration between rappers Jay-Z and Kanye West, was released without being preceded by any leaks, this was noted as an unusual circumstance for a highly anticipated album in the Internet age.

Prevention

 Digital software 
Copy protection software has been used on CD releases to prevent the unauthorised distribution of music onto online sites. A notable example of this was the Copy Control system, a digital rights management software system used on around 22 million CDs from 2001 to 2006, which was discontinued in the wake of its supposed use as a rootkit in the Sony BMG copy protection rootkit scandal.

Digital watermarks, typically used on CD advance copies have allowed leaks to be traced to their original source, are used to deter would-be leakers as it allows them to face legal action. While the source of a leak is not usually announced, it has been in the past; an example of this was with the 2009 Converge album Axe to Fall, where the band publicly named and shamed Shaun Hand at MetalSucks.net, whom the album leak had been traced back to using a digital watermark on a CD advance copy. This can be used to create viral negative publicity.

 Fake album releases 
Prior to the release of her 2003 album American Life, Madonna planted files on file sharing websites purporting to be leaked tracks from the album; in fact, the audio files consisted of Madonna saying: "What the fuck do you think you're doing?" Progressive metal band Tool also announced a fake album called "Systema Encéphale" with a fake tracklist in order to deter and detract from leaks of their 2001 album Lateralus.

 Surprise or early releases 
The rise in leaks during the 2000s led to some popular recording artists surprise-releasing their albums. Some artists have released their albums early in order to deter leaking, for example Greg Puciato's 2020 solo album Child Soldier: Creator of God'', which was released three weeks earlier than its planned release date in response to a leak.

Notable album leaks

See also
 Bootleg recording
 :Category:Lists of unreleased songs by recording artists

References

Internet leaks
Music industry
Copyright infringement